Robert Edward McGinnis (born February 3, 1926) is an American artist and illustrator. McGinnis is known for his illustrations of more than 1,200 paperback book covers, and over 40 movie posters, including Breakfast at Tiffany's (his first film poster assignment), Barbarella, and several James Bond and Matt Helm films.

Biography
Born Robert Edward McGinnis in Cincinnati, Ohio, he was raised in Wyoming, Ohio.

McGinnis became an apprentice at Walt Disney Studios, then studied fine art at Ohio State University. After wartime service in the Merchant Marine he entered advertising and a chance meeting with Mitchell Hooks in 1958 led him to be introduced to Dell Publishing began a career drawing a variety of paperback covers for books written by such authors as Donald Westlake (writing as Richard Stark), Edward S. Aarons, Erle Stanley Gardner, Richard S. Prather, and the Michael Shayne and Carter Brown series.

McGinnis later did artwork for Ladies' Home Journal, Woman's Home Companion, Good Housekeeping, TIME, Argosy, Guideposts, and The Saturday Evening Post.

He was main title designer for The Hallelujah Trail (1965).

McGinnis's attention to detail was such that when he was assigned to do the artwork for Arabesque he requested Sophia Loren's tiger stripe dress be sent for him for a model to wear so he could get the right appearance.

In 1985 McGinnis was awarded the title of "Romantic Artist of the Year" by Romantic Times magazine for his many romance novel paperback covers.

Since 2004, McGinnis has created cover illustrations for the Hard Case Crime paperback series.

Starting in 2016, McGinnis has painted a number of retro-style covers for reissues of books by Neil Gaiman.

He is a member of the Society of Illustrators Hall of Fame. McGinnis is the subject of a documentary film, Robert McGinnis: Painting the Last Rose of Summer, by Paul Jilbert.

References

Sources

External links
 Robert E. McGinnis Gallery
 McGinnis – American Art Archives
 Collection of McGinnis paperback covers at Flickr

1926 births
Living people
American illustrators
Film poster artists
20th-century American painters
American male painters
21st-century American painters
21st-century American male artists
Artists from Cincinnati
Ohio State University alumni
People from Wyoming, Ohio
Romance cover artists
United States Merchant Mariners of World War II
20th-century American male artists